Martina Navratilova and Pam Shriver were the defending champions but lost in the semifinals to Gigi Fernández and Robin White.

Fernández and White won in the final 6–4, 6–1 against Patty Fendick and Jill Hetherington.

Seeds 
Champion seeds are indicated in bold text while text in italics indicates the round in which those seeds were eliminated.

Draw

Finals

Top half

Section 1

Section 2

Bottom half

Section 3

Section 4

External links 
1988 US Open – Women's draws and results at the International Tennis Federation

Women's Doubles
US Open (tennis) by year – Women's doubles
1988 in women's tennis
1988 in American women's sports